Donald Sloan ( – ) was a Scottish rugby union player.

He also played for Edinburgh Academicals and London Scottish FC.

He was the son of Allen Sloan, who was also capped for Scotland.

References
 Bath, Richard (ed.) The Scotland Rugby Miscellany (Vision Sports Publishing Ltd, 2007 )

External links
Profile at scrum.com
Obituary in The Scotsman

1926 births
2008 deaths
Scottish rugby union players
Scotland international rugby union players
Rugby union players from Edinburgh
Edinburgh Academicals rugby union players
Rugby union centres